The Engers–Au railway is a single-track, non-electrified railway line and consists of three sections, which are treated separately here. It is the mainly in the German state of Rhineland-Palatinate, although the section near Au is in North Rhine-Westphalia.

Brexbach Valley Railway, Engers–Siershahn 

The Brexbach Valley Railway runs through the Westerwald along the Brexbach river. It connects the East Rhine Railway with the Lower Westerwald Railway and runs from Engers via Bendorf, Grenzau and Ransbach-Baumbach to Siershahn.

On 31 May 1884, the line was opened after twelve years of planning and construction. The line was 21.6 km long. It had a branch line to Hoehr-Grenzhausen, which was just over 2 km long; in 1909 this was extended by 4 km to reach Hillscheid. The line climbs 230 metres between Engers and Siershahn, requiring more than 36 bridges and viaducts and seven tunnels.

The gradual closure of passenger services began on 28 May 1989. On 1 August 1994, passengers and freight traffic was closed between Engers and Ludwig junction. A small section was used in about 2001 during the construction of the Cologne–Frankfurt high-speed rail line. In 2004, the section between Ludwig junction and Siershahn was also closed. For years the track was very overgrown in places and not passable.

On 26 March 2007, the Verein Brexbachtalbahn e. V (Brexbach Valley Railway Association) was founded in Bendorf. The association has set itself the goal to restore the line for the tourism. Meanwhile, the line between the planned Bendorf station, Kaufland and Siershahn has been cleared, but the section between Bendorf and Grenzau is currently usable only by construction trains.

On 13 February 2009, the Ministry of Transport of Rhineland-Palatinate granted an operating license for the Siershahn–Grenzau section. As part of a celebration of the 125th birthday of the Brexbach Valley Railway on 30 May 2009 and on the following Pentecost, the section was restored to service with a steam train shuttle services for tourist traffic after Transport Minister, Hendrik Hering cut a red and white ribbon to reopen the line. In addition to the shuttles, a steam special ran from Oberhausen. In 2010, tourist trains operated at irregular intervals on the Siershahn–Grenzau section using railbuses, steam trains and LINT diesel multiple units owned by Vectus Verkehrsgesellschaft.

Passenger services between Grenzau and Hillscheid were closed on 1 October 1972. Freight traffic was closed between Grenzau and Höhr-Grenzhausen on 1 August 1994.

Holzbach Valley Railway, Siershahn–Altenkirchen 
The Siershahn–Altenkirchen line is known as the Holzbach Valley Railway (Holzbachtalbahn). Passenger services operated on it from 1887 until 2 June 1984.

It is still used by freight traffic from Altenkirchen. The reactivation of passenger services on the line has been discussed for several years. In 2004, test runs were carried out with a Vectus Verkehrsgesellschaft diesel multiple unit on the Holzbach Valley Railway between Altenkirchen and Raubach. In 2006, the Selters–Raubach line, which had been disused since 1999, was reactivated. Since then Westerwaldbahn (WEBA) has operated freight trains over it together with the Raubach–Altenkirchen section, including to a siding in Neitersen and the Schütz factory in Selters. This traffic is hauled by OnRail DH 1004 diesel locomotives. The section is now owned by WEBA.

Upper Westerwald Railway, Altenkirchen-Au

The section from the Altenkirchen to Au (Sieg), also known as the Upper Westerwald Railway (Oberwesterwaldbahn) was opened on 1 May 1887. After the Second World War, as in many places, Uerdingen railbuses operated on the line. Up to 1975, steam locomotives regularly operated on the line; the last steam locomotives were Betzdorf-based locomotives of class 50, hauling gravel trains from Erbach towards Troisdorf or Cologne. On 23 May 1993, the line between Au and Altenkirchen was converted to a simplified form of signalling and train control known as Zugleitbetrieb.

With the take over of operations by Vectus Verkehrsgesellschaft on 12 December 2004, the class 628 diesel multiple units, which had operated since 1986, were replaced by modern LINT DMUs and the request stops between Altenkirchen and Au became regular stops again.

At the timetable change on 14 December 2014, Hessische Landesbahn (HLB) took over operation of services on the Upper Westerwald Railway from Vectus Verkehrsgesellschaft for a period of 16 years. The current services run under the name of Westerwald-Sieg-Bahn (RB 90), generally from Siegen via Westerburg to Limburg. In the Altenkirchen-Au (-Betzdorf) section there are some additional services at busy times.

Notes

External links

Brexbach Valley Railway

Holzbach Valley Railway
  
  
 

Railway lines in North Rhine-Westphalia
Railway lines in Rhineland-Palatinate
Westerwald
Railway lines opened in 1884
1884 establishments in Germany